Carlos Arredondo (born 26 October 1933) is an Argentine footballer. He played in three matches for the Argentina national football team in 1959. He was also part of Argentina's squad for the 1959 South American Championship that took place in Ecuador.

References

External links
 

1933 births
Living people
Argentine footballers
Argentina international footballers
Association football defenders
Boca Juniors footballers
Club Atlético Banfield footballers
Club Atlético Huracán footballers
Quilmes Atlético Club footballers